The Sauer is a tributary river to the Moselle, flowing through Belgium, Luxembourg and Germany.

Sauer is a German surname, see Sauer (surname). The word sauer means sour, acidic.

Sauer may also refer to:

Sauer (Altenau), a river of North Rhine-Westphalia, Germany
Sauer (Rhine), a river in France and Germany
Sauer & Sohn (founded 1751), a German firearms manufacturer
Sauer Castle, an architecturally significant house in Kansas City, Kansas (US)
Sauer Commission (created 1947), a South African study of segregation policies
C. F. Sauer Company (founded 1887), a cooking products manufacturer
SIG Sauer, US arm of Swiss manufacturing firm Swiss Arms AG
Paul Sauer Bridge, a highway bridge in South Africa
Cube 2: Sauerbraten, a 2004 popular on-line game
Sauer Van, a gas van used in the Sajmište concentration camp

See also

Saur (disambiguation)